The ByWard Market, is a retail and entertainment district in the downtown core of Ottawa, Ontario, Canada. It is located east of the government and business district. The Market district includes the market buildings and open-air market along George, York, ByWard, and William street.

The district is bordered westwardly by Sussex Drive and Mackenzie Avenue, and eastwardly by Cumberland Street. It stretches northwards to Cathcart Street, while to the south it is bordered by Rideau Street. The name refers to the old "By Ward" of the City of Ottawa ('By' deriving from the surname of the engineer, Lt. Colonel John By, who was the area's original surveyor). The district comprises the main commercial part of the historic Lower Town area of Ottawa. According to the Canada 2011 Census, the population of the area was 3,063.

The market itself is regulated by a City of Ottawa municipal services corporation named Marchés d'Ottawa Markets, which also operates the smaller west-end Parkdale Market. The corporation is run by a nine-member board of directors. The market building is open year-round, and open-air stalls offering fresh produce and flowers are operated in the warmer months.

Neighbourhood

Traditionally, the ByWard Market area has been a focal point for Ottawa's French and Irish communities. The large Catholic community supported the construction of the Notre-Dame Cathedral Basilica, one of the largest and oldest Roman Catholic churches in Ottawa. The shape of the cathedral was taken into account in the design of the National Gallery of Canada, which was built across Sussex Drive.

The ByWard Market has been an area of constant change, adapting to the increasingly cosmopolitan nature of downtown Ottawa, as well as trends in Canadian society as a whole. Recently, a multitude of restaurants and specialty food stores have sprouted around the market area, making this neighbourhood one of the liveliest in Ottawa outside of normal business hours. A four-block area around the market provides the densest concentration of eating places, bars, and nightclubs in the National Capital Region. The areas beyond this zone also offer boutiques and restaurants in abundance, and are frequented by a considerable number of buskers. Having acquired a reputation as the city's premier bar district, the Byward Market is thronged (brimming) at night with university students and other young adults.

Over the years, the city has developed five open-air courtyards immediately east of Sussex Drive, stretching from Saint Patrick Street to George Street. These cobblestone courtyards are filled with flowers, park benches, fountains, and sculptures. Several of the houses surrounding them are historic buildings. On the west side of Sussex Drive is the United States Embassy. The building's design, by noted architect David Childs, was supposedly widely criticized by surrounding residents, as one particular Ottawa Sun newspaper article reported that the bronze building-block sculpture created by Joel Shapiro and dedicated by Hillary Clinton was "glaringly and gratingly American", whereas some critics declared that the building's new design "reflected a cautious world view".

The neighbourhood today is markedly heterogeneous; being visited by a mix of young professionals, many families, and some homeless people. At one time, the area had had a serious prostitution problem, which was remedied by a controversial rerouting of traffic through much of the residential area. The area is mainly English-speaking, but there exists a significant francophone population as well. The Market is located in close proximity to the downtown Rideau Centre shopping mall, to Parliament Hill, and to a number of foreign embassies.

History and evolution of the ByWard Market

In 1826, Lieutenant Colonel John By of the Royal Engineers was sent from England to oversee the construction of the Rideau canal system, which was designed to connect the Ottawa River to Kingston, via the St. Lawrence River. It was out of this massive project that the small community of Bytown grew into a flourishing commercial and economic centre. Colonel By prepared plans for two village sites: one on the west side of the Rideau Canal, which was known as Upper Town; and one to the east of the canal, called Lower Town.

The land was cleared and surveyed. Both villages were laid out in a grid system and divided into building lots. The Village of Lower Town was originally bounded by the Rideau River, and Sussex, Clarence, and Rideau Street; additionally, this town plan included an area designated as a commercial section within the block bounded by George, Sussex, York, and King Street.

From the beginning, Bytown was divided. Not only physically, by the canal, but also ethnically, politically, and economically: where Upper Town was settled by officers, tradesmen, and professionals, most of whom were Protestants and Anglicans of English or Scottish descent, Lower Town was settled by labourers who had come to Bytown seeking employment during the building of the canal; these inhabitants were mainly Catholic Irish immigrants and French Canadians. In 1827, the two towns were connected along Rideau Street by Sappers Bridge, which spanned the canal.

First Market

In 1827, Colonel By used £160 of revenue from property rents to build a market building with a courthouse behind it on George Street. This was the original market building, large for the time, and constructed of timber with dovetailed corners, a veranda on each side, and an attached weighing machine. This building served both as a centre for market activities, and as a public hall for political and religious meetings.

In the 1830s, Lower Town enjoyed a period of rapid commercial growth. Stores of every description, hotels, taverns and industrial buildings sprang up all around the market area. The first sawmill in Bytown was erected on York Street and was driven by the waters of the By Wash. Soon Lower Town became commercially dominant.

The market on George Street quickly began to do a flourishing business providing lumber camps with supplies. Farm communities shipped goods up the Ottawa River or along the Rideau waterway to merchants in the Lower Town Market. A large butchering and meatpacking industry developed on the south side of George Street across from the market. This became known as the "Butcher's Shambles". Around 1840, a public well was opened in the market square. Lower Town had become an established commercial and residential centre.
 
In 1842 the market building and the courthouse in the centre of George Street were dismantled. However, the market area continued to operate in a haphazard way around the remains of the old market building. The mixed farming of the surrounding region was dependent on Bytown for the distribution of its agricultural goods, and the local community required a market to sustain its growth. When Bytown was incorporated as a town on July 28, 1847, the new city council recognized the need for an organized market area, and made this one of their first priorities.

Second Market
The debate for the site of the market began almost as soon as the first council was elected. Lower Town had the political advantage, since it was entitled to four councillors out of seven elected. Lower Town enjoyed several other advantages over Upper Town for the site of a market building. Lower Town was linked with the outlying farming areas that extended from Gloucester Township to Russell and Prescott Counties. Lower Town was already an established commercial centre for goods and its citizens wanted to keep the major services there to prevent a population and economic shift to Upper Town.

After extensive discussion, a motion was passed that two markets should be built, one for each town. In Upper Town, Nicholas Sparks offered a piece of his land near Sappers Bridge for the West Ward Market.

The two sites were approved by council on June 26, 1848. In order to oversee the construction of the two markets a Market Committee was set up. Charles Sparrow, a councillor for Lower Town, became the Chairman of the Committee.

The Lower Town Market Building officially opened on Saturday, November 6, 1848. The ceremony was marked by a flag raising, several speeches, and a band which played "Rule Britannia". This new market building was constructed of wood with room for market stalls on the ground floor and a well-lit upper floor to be used for public meetings. The Upper Town market was converted into a town hall and remained this way until 1878, when it was demolished to make way for a new city hall.

In September 1849, the market area was the scene of the "Stony Monday Riot". The conflict was sparked by the political and religious disputes between Catholic Reformers (in Lower Town) and Protestant Tories (in Upper Town). The controversy came to a head during a non-political reception for the visiting Lord Elgin. During the meeting in the Lower Town market building on September 17, the crowd became agitated. Reformers and Conservatives separated into two groups and a stone-throwing fracas began which lasted about 15 minutes. The group of Conservatives drove the Reformers off of the market square, west along York Street and up Clarence Street where they took refuge behind the fence of L'Esperance's Hotel. Soon after a gun battle began in the market square between the two parties. When the riot was over one man was killed, 30 were wounded and 15 men (all Reformers) were arrested.

The Lower Town market continued successfully into the 1850s. Due to overcrowding, it was decided that the market should be expanded. In 1853, four adjoining lots on York and Clarence Streets were purchased for the expansion plan. A bell was purchased and installed by the council in order to regulate the market hours.

Third Market
While the expansion study was underway, the market building was destroyed by fire on January 21, 1862. During the 1860s and early 1870s several other fires hindered the growth of the market area. Fortunately, throughout this time the market continued to function, and the council persevered in its efforts to erect a new market building. In 1864, construction of a new building, designed by architect Sydney B. Fripp, began between Clarence and York Streets. This market building was open in 1865. Although it offered better indoor facilities for vendors, it did not improve the overcrowding outside of the building.

From 1840 to 1870, the economic base of Ottawa changed drastically, on account of the removal of the British military, the end of the continental fur trade, and the expansion of the lumber industry. With the opening of the canal and the incorporation of the city in 1855, Ottawa was forced to expand its role as a regional trading centre in agricultural products and services. All of this agricultural and commercial activity was directed through the Byward market area. As a result, the market area was expanded and York, ByWard and William Streets became a hub of commerce. Many industries converged in this area: bakeries, bottling works, a soap and candle factory, a broom manufacturer, as well as carriage and furniture manufacturers. Other businesses operating in the marketplace included retail outlets for agricultural machinery, flour and feed traders, grocery provisioners, hardware suppliers and merchants engaged in similar import/export enterprises.

Many service industries also developed, notably saddlers, tailors, carpenters, hostlers, metal and tin workers. In addition butchers, fishmongers, and fresh fruit and vegetable merchants lined the streets facing the market building. (Of these, the Lapointe Fish Market, established in 1867, still operates in the market.)

The market building itself was divided into sections for farmers, gardeners, slaughterers, florists, hucksters, livestock dealers, etc. These sections were subdivided into stalls, which were leased annually by the vendors. The vendors were also charged a fee for keeping the market clean. A Market Inspector was appointed to oversee the market area and the public weigh scales. Additionally, a meat inspector had an office in the market building.

During this time most merchants resided above their stores, or contained their businesses in sheds to the side or rear of their home. Hotels, taverns and boarding houses also became common on the streets around the market.

Fourth Market

Because of constant overcrowding and filth, council proposed an expansion of the market in 1871. Once again Upper and Lower Town were in competition for a market venue. As before, it was decided to construct two buildings; one in Wellington Ward for Upper Town and one between George and York, directly to the south of the existing building in ByWard. On April 14, 1876 the building designed by James Mather was officially opened in the ByWard market. A beautiful edifice in the French style, it stood two storeys high with a mansard roof and an iron cresting finish. Constructed of white brick with limestone dressings, the building was distinguished by two towers which rose  over the arched gateway at the south end. Concurrently, the filthy and stagnant By Wash at the southern end of the building was covered over and turned into a proper sewer.
 
The ByWard market continued to flourish into the twentieth century. By now, French-Canadian and Jewish merchants and vendors were becoming the two dominant ethnic cultures in the market area. The market also had to change in order to meet the new demands that accompanied the introduction of modern technologies such as refrigeration and the automobile. The focus of the market was shifting as Rideau Street became an important commercial business area, and department stores were developing and becoming popular.

Fifth Market

In 1926, James Mather's market building was completely destroyed by fire. It was replaced by the building that exists today between George and York Streets. The other stone market building between York and Clarence Streets survived several fires and renovations but was demolished in 1949. By this time parking for automobiles was in short supply, and consequently, the empty block was turned into a parking lot. In 1975 a parking garage was constructed during major renovations of the market area. The side fronting York Street was turned into commercial space, and now houses two restaurants, a produce store and Aubrey's butcher shop, which has been in the market since 1908.

Today, the market area still retains much of the flavour of its past. Since the 1840s, the ByWard Market has served as one of the principal hubs of commerce, entertainment and leisure activities in a locale that has been transformed from a remote colonial outpost to the centre of Canada's National Capital Region. Many of the market's original industries and services have given way to boutiques and restaurants. Nevertheless, Ottawa residents and tourists continue to gather in the area to purchase vegetables and groceries, as well as to enjoy the colourful vendors and street entertainment.

In October 2000, broadcaster CHUM Limited opened a new studio complex in the ByWard Market at 87 George Street, known as the CHUM MarketMediaMall. CHUM's then-NewNet station CHRO moved its primary operations from its original facilities in Pembroke to the new building (including a Speaker's Corner video booth); the facility also housed CHUM Radio stations CKKL-FM, CJMJ-FM, CFRA and CFGO. The facility came under CTV ownership when CTVglobemedia bought CHUM Limited in 2006, and then under Bell ownership when Bell Media re-purchased the CTV assets in 2011. When a fire broke out at the studio complex of CTV owned-and-operated station CJOH-DT in Nepean in 2010, destroying it, this meant CJOH moved into the MarketMediaMall complex as well.

See also

 Lower Town
 List of Ottawa neighbourhoods
 West Ward Market Building (Ottawa)
 List of designated heritage properties in Ottawa

References

External links

 ByWard Market Business Improvement Area
 Lowertown West Community Association
 ByWard Market Square landmark building
 ByWard Market Neighbourhood Profile

Neighbourhoods in Ottawa
Busking venues
Designated heritage properties in Ottawa
Food markets in Canada
Shopping districts and streets in Canada
Tourist attractions in Ottawa
Entertainment districts in Canada
Gentrification in Canada
Historic Jewish communities in Canada